Lamont is an unincorporated community and coal town in Perry County, Kentucky, United States. Their Post Office  has been closed.

References

Unincorporated communities in Perry County, Kentucky
Unincorporated communities in Kentucky
Coal towns in Kentucky